This is a list of stratigraphic units from which mosasaur body fossils have been recovered. Units listed are all either formation rank or higher (e.g. group). Formations are listed by continent, and alphabetically within the individual lists.

Africa

Antarctica

Asia

Europe

North America

Oceania

South America

References 

Mosasaurs
Mosasaur-bearing stratigraphic units
Mosasaurs